Erika Meitner (born 1975 in New York) is an American poet.

Life 
She graduated from Dartmouth College with an A.B. in 1996, and from the University of Virginia with an MFA in creative writing, and an MA in religious studies.

She taught at University of Virginia, University of Wisconsin-Madison, and the University of California, Santa Cruz.  She was a Fulbright Scholar in Creative Writing, at Queen's University Belfast. She teaches at Virginia Tech.

Her work has appeared in The Southern Review, The American Poetry Review, Shenandoah, Indiana Review, Alaska Quarterly Review, and Virginia Quarterly Review.

Works
"The Book of Dissolution", AGNI online
"Big Box Encounter", Slate, April 20, 2010
"January Towns"; "With/out", Anti-
"Quisiera Declarar", From the Fishouse
"Elegy with Construction Sounds, Water, Fish", Virginia Quarterly Review, Spring 2010, pp. 202–203
Inventory at the All-Night Drugstore Anhinga Press, 2003, 
Ideal Cities, HarperCollins, 2010, 
Makeshift Instructions for Vigilant Girls, Anhinga Press, 2011. 
Holy Moly Carry Me, BOA Editions, Limited, 2018 
Useful Junk, BOA Editions, 2022 ISBN 978-1-950774-53-1

Essays
"On Rita Dove", Women Poets on Mentorship: Efforts and Affections, Editors Arielle Greenberg, Rachel Zucker, University of Iowa Press, 2008, 
"On Rita Dove", Best African American Essays 2010, Editors Gerald Early, Randall Kennedy, Random House, Inc., 2009,

Awards 

2009 National Poetry Series, for Ideal Cities
2018 National Jewish Book Award: Poetry, for Holy Moly Carry Me
2018 Finalist: National Book Critics Circle Award: Poetry, for Holy Moly Carry Me 
2019 Finalist: Library of Virginia: Poetry, for Holy Moly Carry Me

References

External links

Author's website
"Erika Meitner Discusses Peeps, Virginia and Yi-Fu Tuan: An Interview by Serena Agusto-Cox", 32poems, May 5, 2009
"Erika Meitner", From the Fishouse
"Five Questions With . . .Erika Meitner, poet",  Sentinel, Rebecca Swain Vadnie
http://www.writersdigest.com/editor-blogs/poetic-asides/poetry-craft-tips/interview-with-poet-erika-meitner

1975 births
Writers from New York (state)
Dartmouth College alumni
University of Virginia alumni
University of Virginia faculty
University of Wisconsin–Madison faculty
University of California, Santa Cruz faculty
Virginia Tech faculty
Living people
American women poets
21st-century American poets
American women academics
21st-century American women writers